The men's decathlon at the 2018 European Athletics Championships took place at the Olympic Stadium on 7 and 8 August.

Records

Schedule
All times are Brasilia Time (UTC-3)

Results

100 metres

Long jump

Shot put

High jump

400 metres

110 metres hurdles

Discus throw

Pole vault

Javelin throw

1500 metres

Final standings

References

Decathlon Men European Athletic Association

External links
 official championship site

Decathlon
Combined events at the European Athletics Championships